Arthur James Mooney (25 February 1920 – 29 February 1972) was an Irish sailor. He competed at the 1948 Summer Olympics and the 1960 Summer Olympics.

References

External links
 

1920 births
1972 deaths
Irish male sailors (sport)
Olympic sailors of Ireland
Sailors at the 1948 Summer Olympics – Firefly
Sailors at the 1960 Summer Olympics – Dragon
Sportspeople from Dublin (city)